William Loftus (born March 6, 1975, in Vancouver, British Columbia) is a retired Canadian Football League Safety who played 11 seasons in the CFL with the Edmonton Eskimos and Montreal Alouettes. He was a two-time Grey Cup champion, having won in 2002 with the Alouettes and in 2005 with the Eskimos.

External links
CFL.ca

1975 births
Living people
Edmonton Elks players
Manitoba Bisons football players
Montreal Alouettes players
Canadian football people from Vancouver
Players of Canadian football from British Columbia